John Edward Salisbury (born 26 January 1934 in Birmingham) is a British former athlete who mainly competed in the 400 metres.

Salisbury competed for Great Britain at the 1956 Summer Olympics in Melbourne where he won the bronze medal in the 4 × 400 metres relay with his team mates Peter Higgins, Michael Wheeler and Derek Johnson.

At the 1958 European Athletics Championships in Stockholm, Salisbury won the silver medal after completing the 400 metres in 46.5 seconds, as well as a gold medal in the 4 × 400 metres relay having recorded a time of 3 minutes 7.9 seconds. In the same year he competed at the Commonwealth Games in Cardiff and won silver in the 4 × 440 yards relay with team members Derek Johnson, Edward Sampson, and John Wrighton. They recorded a time of 3 minutes 9.6 seconds.

References 

1934 births
Living people
Sportspeople from Birmingham, West Midlands
British male sprinters
English male sprinters
Olympic athletes of Great Britain
Olympic bronze medallists for Great Britain
Athletes (track and field) at the 1956 Summer Olympics
Commonwealth Games medallists in athletics
Athletes (track and field) at the 1958 British Empire and Commonwealth Games
European Athletics Championships medalists
Medalists at the 1956 Summer Olympics
Olympic bronze medalists in athletics (track and field)
Commonwealth Games silver medallists for England
Medallists at the 1958 British Empire and Commonwealth Games